Xylopsocus gibbicollis, common name "Common auger beetle", is a species of beetle of the Bostrichidae family.

References

Bostrichidae
Beetles described in 1873